Panama's foreign relations are conventional in outlook, with Panama being especially aligned with United States since the 1989 US invasion to topple the regime of General Manuel Noriega. The United States cooperates with the Panamanian government in promoting economic, political, security, and social development through U.S. and international agencies.

Diplomatic relations list

Panama has established diplomatic relations with following countries:

Bilateral relations

Multilateral relations 
Panama is a member of the UN General Assembly (and most major UN agencies) and has served three terms in the UN Security Council. In November 2006,  it was elected to serve a two-year term on the Security Council, beginning January 1, 2007.  It maintains membership in several international financial institutions, including the World Bank, the Inter-American Development Bank, and the International Monetary Fund.

Panama is a member of the Organization of American States and was a founding member of the Rio Group. Although it was suspended from the Latin American Economic System — known informally both as the Group of Eight and the Rio Group — in 1988 due to its internal political system under Manuel Noriega, Panama was readmitted in September, 1994 as an acknowledgment of its present democratic credentials.

Panama is also one of the founding members of the Union of Banana Exporting Countries and belongs to the Inter-American Tropical Tuna Commission. Panama is a member of the Central American Parliament (PARLACEN) as well as the Central American Integration System (SICA). Panama joined its six Central American neighbors at the 1994 Summit of the Americas in signing the Alliance for Sustainable Development known as the Conjunta Centroamerica-USA or CONCAUSA to promote sustainable economic development in the region.

Panama is also a member of the International Criminal Court with a Bilateral Immunity Agreement of protection for the US-military (as covered under Article 98).

See also
 List of diplomatic missions in Panama
 List of diplomatic missions of Panama

References

Further reading

 Ealy, Lawrence O. The Republic of Panama in world affairs, 1903-1950 (U of Pennsylvania Press, 1951). online
 Farnsworth, David N., and James W. McKenney. US-Panama relations, 1903–1978: A study in linkage politics (Routledge, 2020).
 Major, John. "‘Pro mundi beneficio’? The Panama Canal as an international issue, 1943–8." Review of International Studies 9.1 (1983): 17-34.

 Williams Jr, Harold E. Panamanian-US Relations Towards 2000: An Opportunity for Partnership (Naval Postgraduate School, 1995) online.